Bagh-e Jamal (also Romanized as Bāgh-e Jamāl, Bāgh Jamāl, and Bāgh-i-Jamāl) is a village in Zhan Rural District, in the Central District of Dorud County, Lorestan Province, Iran. At the 2006 census, its population was 57, in 18 families.

References 

Towns and villages in Dorud County